Timotej of Debar and Kichevo (birth name: Slave Jovanovski) is the current Metropolitan of the Diocese of Debar and Kichevo which is part of the Macedonian Orthodox Church. He was born in Mlado Nagorichane, Kumanovo, on 20 October 1951, Republic of North Macedonia.

References

See also
 Ohrid
 Republic of North Macedonia

Members of the Macedonian Orthodox Church
People from Kumanovo
Living people
1951 births